Blackcat Lake is a small meromictic lake in Haliburton, Ontario. The lake is regularly stocked with trout.

In 2004 a proposal to make the Clear Lake Conservation Reserve a World Heritage Site included Blackcat Lake's meromictic status.

References 

Meromictic lakes
Haliburton County